This is a round-up of the 1997 Sligo Intermediate Football Championship. Cloonacool, a club which had struggled in the lower levels of club football for much of its twenty years since being re-organised, made a major breakthrough by winning the Intermediate title of 1997, beating the one-time leading force of Sligo football, St. Patrick's, in the final.

First round

Quarter finals

Semi-finals

Sligo Intermediate Football Championship Final

References

 Sligo Champion (Autumn 1997)
 Sligo Weekender (Autumn 1997)

Sligo Intermediate Football Championship
Sligo Intermediate Football Championship